Sibylle Scherer (born 9 January 1992) is a Swiss handballer who plays for LK Zug and the Switzerland national team.

Achievements
Swiss Premium League:
Winner: 2013, 2014, 2015

References
 

  
1992 births
Living people
People from Zug
Sportspeople from the canton of Zug
Swiss female handball players